Staverton is a village and civil parish in the South Hams of Devon, England consisting of 297 households and a population of 717 (total parish).

There is one pub, The Sea Trout, which is in the centre of the village. The village also has a public phone box, multiple notice boards and two post boxes.

Parish church
Staverton's Church of England parish church of St Paul de Leon is mostly early 14th century. It has a nave and north and south aisles and a thin west tower. The medieval windows have been replaced by ones of a later period. Features of interest include the rood screen (much restored), the 18th-century pulpit, and a monument to the family of Worth, 1629.

Historic estates
The parish of Staverton contains various historic estates including:
Kingston, long a seat of the Rowe family.

Transport
There are two stops of the South Devon Railway Trust within the village boundary: Staverton railway station and Nappers Halt. Staverton railway station is next to Staverton Bridge, which crosses the River Dart and was probably built around 1413. It is considered to be one of the best examples of medieval bridges surviving in Devon. "Seven obtusely pointed arches; one of the oldest Devon bridges". The bridge's name was adopted for the folk group formed in the 1970s by Sam Richards, Tish Stubbs and Paul Wilson.

Village Band
Staverton is home to a village band: The Stavertones. A Nonet, the band plays a hip blend of funky fusion, Jammin' Jazz and pop.

With a Facebook page liked by over 141 people, a good proportion of the population of the village, the band is a prominent fixture in village life.

Notable people
George Caunter, baptised in Staverton in 1758, was Acting Superintendent of Penang (then Prince of Wales Island), as well as holding a number of other posts in the administration of the island. The Caunter family lived at Abham, a tenement in Staverton, for several generations.

References

External links

Staverton's history

Civil parishes in South Hams
Villages in South Hams